Yorkrakine Rock is a granite rock formation located approximately  north of Tammin and  south east of Dowerin in the eastern Wheatbelt region of Western Australia. It makes up part of the Yorkrakine Rock Nature Reserve and is located on the Tammin Wyalkatchem Road. The reserve has access roads and parking as well as toilets and picnic tables, but camping is not permitted.

The base of the rock, the outcrop's apron, is good habitat for flora and fauna and is surrounded by York gum (yandee, Eucalyptus loxophleba) and jam (mangart, Acacia acuminata) woodlands. 

The reserve and most of the Wheatbelt are situated on the granites and granitic gneisses of the Yilgarn Block of the Precambrian Shield.
 
The traditional owners are the Noongar peoples. The area was used by Noongar women as a birthing site. Many children, and possibly women, who didn't survive labour have been buried at the site. A plaque commemorating the women who gave birth there, the children born, and the women and children who didn't survive has been placed at the site.

Native mammals found at the site include: euro Macropus robustus, common dunnart Sminthopsis murina and echidna Tachyglossus aculeatus. 
Raptors found on the reserve include the brown goshawk Accipiter fasciatus, little eagle Aquila morphnoides, wedge-tailed eagle Aquila audax, Falco peregrinus and brown falcon Falco berigora,  along with barnowl Tyto alba and tawny frogmouth Podargus strigoides. The banded plover Vanellus tricolor, laughing dove Streptopelia senegalensis and domestic pigeon are also found at the site. Parrots include subspecies Polytelis anthopeplus anthopeplus, ring-necked Platycercus zonarius and mulga parrot Psephotellus varius, and the galah Cacatua roseicapilla and rainbow bee-eater Merops ornatus have also been observed.

Other animals may be endemic to the area. The critically endangered trapdoor spider Kwonkan eboracum was first collected there and is the site of the only known records for the species. A pseudoscorpion species, Synsphyronus elegans is only known to occur at exfoliated slabs on the rock. Introduced species found are black rat, European rabbit and fox.

Flora found around the site include: Eucalyptus orbifolia, Eucalyptus loxophleba, Acacia acuminata and Eucalyptus platycorys. Both Acacia yorkrakinensis and Grevillea yorkrakinensis are named for the area.

See also
Granite outcrops of Western Australia

References

Wheatbelt (Western Australia)
Rock formations of Western Australia
Places of Noongar significance